Krazy Kirk and the Hillbillies is a musical/variety group that performs at Knott's Berry Farm. Prior to 2014, they performed for 26+ years at Disneyland in Anaheim, California as Billy Hill and the Hillbillies. The group performs a bluegrass country-music-centered show along with classic rock and rap (performed in a country and bluegrass style).

History
The group had four original members, all using the stage name of Billy Hill, who performed from August 5, 1992 until November 1994. The original members are:
 Kirk Wall (master of ceremonies and sometime-Elvis impersonator), guitar and fiddle
 Mario Hildago, banjo
 Dennis Fetchet, fiddle
 John Marshall (founder), bass

Mario was later replaced before the opening inside the Golden Horseshoe Saloon on December 18, 1994 by Evan Marshall (mandolin), who left the band in 2003.

Billy Hill and the Hillbillies plays music from all genres in a folk/bluegrass style while interacting with audiences. The roster consists of a regular rotation of 10 to 12 musicians, with Wall generally serving as the lead singer while playing fiddle and guitar.

Wall, who got his start in show business as a comedian, said he geared his jokes to adults in the crowd more than the children. "The kids might not get the jokes," Wall said, "but they at least get a kick out of seeing their mom and dad crack up." A sometime Elvis impersonator, Wall noted that Disney did not prohibit him, or any other Disney musician, from pursuing side projects. 
One such show took place in Buffalo, New York in 1997 as part of the Buffalo Philharmonic Orchestra's TGIF series. According to Mary Kunz of Buffalo News, the group performed classical pieces together with the orchestra which "proved how much bluegrass and classical music have in common". After intermission, Hill and the Hillbillies re-emerged dressed in overalls, "like some kind of Appalachian Marx Brothers", and performed another hour of country standards including "Hey Good Lookin'", "Tennessee Waltz", and "Orange Blossom Special".

Prior to February 3, 2009, Billy Hill and the Hillbillies were performing 7 days a week inside the Golden Horseshoe Saloon as three different teams:

On November 6, 2013, a press release on the Disney Parks official blog announced that the Billy Hill and the Hillbillies Show would retire as of January 6, 2014, ending a run of 21 consecutive years performing in Frontierland. A group called "Save The Billys" started a petition and Facebook event in an attempt to persuade Disney to change its mind on retiring the show.

In late 2013 the "Blue Team" consisting of Kirk Wall, Anders Swanson, Dennis Fetchet, and Rick Storey, started their own group named "Krazy Kirk and the Hillbillies". The show is planned to have the same music, comedy style, and members of Disneyland's Billy Hill & The Hillbillies but performing outside of Disneyland in both public and private events. The first performance for this group was on New Year's Eve 12/31/2013 at Knott's Berry Farm.

Locations 
 Critter Country from 1986 until 1990: The original home of Billy and the Hillbillies.
 Disneyland's Golden Horseshoe Saloon from 1992 to June 17, 2012. (scheduled)
 Disneyland's Big Thunder Ranch: 1999-2000 while the Golden Horseshoe was occupied by the Woody's Roundup show based on Disney and Pixar's Toy Story 2.
 Disneyland's Big Thunder Ranch: June 18, 2012 to January 6, 2014: The last home of the act. (scheduled)
 Knott's Berry Farm's Birdcage Theater: January 12, 2014 to 2019:Now known as "Krazy Kirk and the Hillbillies"
 Knott's Berry Farm's Wagon Camp: 2019 to the present

References

Further reading

External links
 History of the Golden Horseshoe Saloon: Billy Hill and the Hillbillies

American bluegrass music groups
Walt Disney Parks and Resorts entertainment
Disneyland
American country music groups